Antardhaan is an Indian Bengali-language thriller drama film written and directed by Arindam Bhattacharya. Initially the date of release was fixed on 7 April 2020 but it released theatrically on 10 December 2021 under the banner of Dreamliner Entertainment. The release was postponed due to the COVID-19 pandemic in India.

Plot
Anirban is a professor who lives in Delhi with his wife Tanu and daughter Zinia. He is transferred to a lonely town named Kasauli. They enjoy a lot in the new city but their neighbors are mysterious. One day their daughter Zinia goes missing during an excursion. Anirban and his wife enquire and come to know that Zinia's friends didn't even accompany her.

Cast
 Parambrata Chatterjee as Anirban
 Tanushree Chakraborty as Tanu
 Mamata Shankar as Neighbor
 Rajatava Dutta as Niladri Sen, CID officer
 Harsh Chhaya as Neelambar
 Sujan Mukhopadhyay as Hapu
 Mohar Choudhury as Zinia
 Akshay Kapoor as Harjinder Sahni

References

External links

2021 films
Bengali-language Indian films
Films postponed due to the COVID-19 pandemic
Indian thriller drama films
Films about kidnapping in India